Narc (stylized as NARC) is a 1988 run and gun arcade game designed by Eugene Jarvis for Williams Electronics and programmed by George Petro, Todd Allen, and Eugene Jarvis, with art by Jack Haeger, John Newcomer, and Lin Young. It was one of the first ultra-violent video games and a frequent target of parental criticism of the video game industry. The object is to arrest and kill drug offenders, confiscate their money and drugs, and defeat "Mr. Big". It was the first game in the newly restarted Williams Electronics coin-op video game division.  Shortly before its release, Williams acquired the video and pinball divisions of Bally/Midway.

Narc was ported to the Commodore 64, Atari ST, Amiga, ZX Spectrum, Amstrad CPC, and NES. In 2005, the franchise was re-launched with a new game for the Xbox and PS2, which was released on March 22, 2005. A GameCube version of said game was planned, but was ultimately scrapped.

Gameplay

The game's main characters are Max Force and Hit Man, who have received a memo from Spencer Williams, Narcotics Opposition chairman in Washington, D.C. dispatching them on Project NARC. Their mission is to apprehend Mr. Big, head of an underground drug trafficking and terrorist organization.

The player controls either Max Force or Hit Man, who shoot or arrest junkies, drug dealers, and organized crime kingpins. Max and Hit are each equipped with an automatic weapon and a missile launcher. When an enemy is dispatched using the latter, they explode in a torrent of scorched and bloody appendages. Some enemies can be arrested after they surrender and then float away with "busted" over them. This is then added to a tally at the end of the level along with drugs and money confiscated from other enemies that they dropped when gunned down (the game awards more points at the end of a round for arresting enemies without killing them).

Technical details
The arcade game uses what is termed a "medium resolution monitor": higher resolution than televisions and normal arcade monitors, but in a smaller physical size.

Narc is the first arcade game to use the Texas Instruments TMS34010, a 32-bit processor with graphics-oriented instructions built-in. It was later used in Smash TV, Mortal Kombat, and NBA Jam.

Ports
The August, 1990 Nintendo Entertainment System (NES) version of NARC, published by Acclaim Entertainment and developed by Rare was billed as "the first video game with a strong anti-drug message," though Nintendo forced all drug references to be removed from the actual gameplay. The game retained most of its violence and gore.

Most of the computer ports had their music ported by Tony Williams, credited as "Sound Images" and David Wise ported the arcade music to the NES. The Game Boy version of Terminator 2: Judgment Day uses some music from NARC.

Reception
All the versions of the game generally received positive reviews, being praised for its intense action and enjoyable gameplay, but criticism for its repetitiveness, including 9/10 from CRASH, 8/10 from Sinclair User and 72% from Your Sinclair. Matt Bielby of Your Sinclair called it "one of the most objectionable Speccy games I've seen in ages", and called it "repetitive" and the plot "utter nonsense." However, due to being one of the first games to feature blood, it has been a target of concerns and criticism from parents.

Legacy
In 1990, Acclaim released NARC as a handheld LCD game.

The main musical theme by Brian L. Schmidt was recorded by the band Pixies and released as a B-side to their "Planet of Sound" single in 1990.

Max Force and villains Dr. Spike Rush, Joe Rockhead and Mr. Big appeared as characters in the cartoon The Power Team and in the film 22 Jump Street.

NARC is included in the Midway Arcade Treasures 2 (2004) collection.

2005 game
A 2005 update was developed by VIS Entertainment and published by Midway Games for the Xbox, PlayStation 2, and Microsoft Windows. The Windows version,  only released in Europe, was developed by Point of View.

The game casts the players as narcotics officer Jack Forzenski and DEA agent Marcus Hill, former partners reunited who are instructed to investigate a new drug on the streets called Liquid Soul. After arresting dealers and confiscating their stock, the player can either take the confiscated items to the evidence room, or keep them for future use. This confers benefits such as improved weapons accuracy. Dealing drugs for financial benefit is also possible.

A March 21, 2005 press release announced the game's shipment to retailers and emphasized that NARC was designed for an "older audience". The game was given an M rating.

Footnotes

References
Citing 'Narc,' Ill. Gov. Seeks Video-Game Sales Ban, Mar. 22, 2005.
Johnson, Eric (a.k.a. VegitaBOD): NARC Walkthrough/FAQ.
Midway Ships NARC for the Xbox, Xbox News, Mar. 21, 2005.
Morris, Chris: Weed, speed and LSD – in a video game?, Mar. 12, 2004.
NARC; God of War; Heritage of Kings: The Settlers, The Washington Post, Mar. 27, 2005.
Pepin, Chris: NARC NES manual.

External links

Narc on Coinop.org
Soundtrack Info
PC Game Source

1988 video games
Amiga games
Amstrad CPC games
Arcade video games
Atari ST games
Cancelled GameCube games
Commodore 64 games
Video games about the illegal drug trade
Midway video games
Nintendo Entertainment System games
Organized crime video games
PlayStation 2 games
Run and gun games
Censored video games
Video games with digitized sprites
Williams video games
Windows games
Xbox games
ZX Spectrum games
Video games about police officers
Video games scored by Brian L. Schmidt
Video games scored by David Wise
Video games developed in the United States
Drugs in popular culture
Ocean Software games
VIS Entertainment games